The Primera A 2008 season (officially "Torneo Primera A 2008") started on February 23, 2008. The Apertura champions was Orión and the Clausura champion was Río Abajo F.C. On November 15, 2008 a grand final was played and Río Abajo were crowned champions after defeating 2–1 Orión. However Río Abajo lost the promotion play-off against Plaza Amador in a 3–2 aggregate score, thus failing to promote to ANAPROF.

Changes for 2008
The league is once again separated into Apertura and Clausura.
The Primera A champion will play a playoff for promotion with the last team in the ANAPROF general standings instead of being promoted directly.
There will be no relegation during this season.
The Apertura and Clausura winners will play a match in order to decide an overall champion who would play the playoff for promotion to ANAPROF. This playoff between the Apertura and Clausura champions is the same as the Grand Championship format used previously in ANAPROF and Primera A.
Club Deportivo Policía Nacional renamed themselves during mid-season to Sociedad Deportiva Atlético Nacional.

Primera A 2008 teams

Primera A Apertura 2008

Apertura 2008 Standings

Green indicates Semifinal Berth

Apertura 2008 Results table

[*] The score is unknown, but it was reported as a win for Paraiso F.C.

Final round

Semifinals 1st leg

Semifinals 2nd leg

Final

Primera A Clausura 2008

Clausura 2008 standings

Green indicates Semifinal Berth (Los equipos en verde señalan los clasificados a semifinales).

Clausura 2008 results table

[*] Awarded 3–0 to Pan de Azúcar by ANAPROF because Paraíso failed the league's regulation by not bringing their away kit, thus since both teams' home kit was white the game had to be suspended.
[**] Originally 3–1 victory for Paraíso but awarded to Chorrillito.

Final round

Semifinals 1st leg

Semifinals 2nd leg

Final

Primera A 2008 Grand Final

Final

Promotion playoff

Río Abajo remain in Primera A''

1st Leg

2nd Leg

References

2006
2
Pan
2
Pan